is a railway station located in the city of Kakamigahara,  Gifu Prefecture,  Japan, operated by the private railway operator Meitetsu.

Lines

Station layout
Shin Naka Station has one ground-level island platform connected to the station building by a pedestrian tunnel. The station is staffed.

Platforms

Adjacent stations

History
It was renamed to its present name on July of the same year.

Surrounding area
Naka Station on the JR Central Takayama Main Line

See also
 List of Railway Stations in Japan

External links

  

Railway stations in Japan opened in 1926
Stations of Nagoya Railroad
Railway stations in Gifu Prefecture
Kakamigahara, Gifu